Lolita Chakrabarti  (born 1 June 1969) is a British actress and writer.

Early life
Chakrabarti was born in Kingston upon Hull, England, to Bengali Hindu parents from India on 1 June 1969. She grew up in Birmingham, where her father worked as an orthopaedic surgeon at Selly Oak Hospital.

Career

Acting

Chakrabarti graduated from the Royal Academy of Dramatic Art (RADA) in 1990. From 1993 to 1996, she presented the BBC children's educational programme Numbertime.

Her screen credits include Vigil, Showtrial, The Wheel of Time, Criminal: UK, Riviera, Delicious, Defending the Guilty, All Is True, Beowulf: Return to the Shieldlands, The Casual Vacancy, My Mad Fat Diary, Jekyll and Hyde, Intruders, Bodies, Vera, Outnumbered, Hustle, Born to Kill, Forgiven, Extras Christmas Special, William and Mary, Fortysomething, Holby City, Silent Witness, and as WPC Jamila Blake in the long-running ITV drama The Bill.

Her theatre credits include Fanny and Alexander for The Old Vic (2018), Gertrude in Hamlet starring Tom Hiddleston and directed by Kenneth Branagh for RADA (2017), The Great Game: Afghanistan for the Tricycle Theatre (2009), Last Seen for the Almeida (2009) (which she co-wrote), Free Outgoing for the Royal Court (2008) and John Gabriel Borkman for the Donmar Warehouse (2007).

Writing
In 2018, Chakrabarti curated The Greatest Wealth for The Old Vic, London. She commissioned eight monologues, of which she also wrote one in recognition of the 70th birthday of the NHS. The season was relaunched online during the pandemic in 2020, with a new monologue written by novelist Bernardine Evaristo.

She adapted Italo Calvino's 1972 novel Invisible Cities, in collaboration with 59 Productions, Rambert Dance Company and Sidi Larbi Cherkaoui. Presented at Manchester International Festival and Brisbane Festival in 2019, it was reimagined as a virtual realty film named Stones of Venice for Hong Kong New Vision Festival. In 2020, Chakrabarti was dramaturg on the dance piece Message in a Bottle for Kate Prince, ZooNation and Sadler's Wells Theatre.

Adrian Lester and Lolita Chakrabarti: A Working Diary was published by Bloomsbury in 2020, charting a year in the working life of Chakrabarti and her husband. Her play Hymn at the Almeida Theatre opened during lockdown in 2021, also starring Lester. The production was live-streamed for several nights to critical acclaim, and later opened to a live audience in July of the same year. She has also written The Goddess for Woman's Hour on BBC Radio 4, Faith, Hope and Blue Charity for the same station, and co-wrote Last Seen for Slung Low Theatre Company and the Almeida Theatre.

Red Velvet 
Red Velvet, Chakrabarti's play about Ira Aldridge, an African-American actor at the centre of controversy in 1833 when he takes over from Edmund Kean in Othello at the Theatre Royal in Covent Garden premiered in 2012 at the Tricycle Theatre, London. It returned to The Tricycle in 2014 before transferring to St. Ann's Warehouse in New York. It returned again to the Garrick Theatre in London's West End as part of Kenneth Branagh's season in 2016. Chicago Shakespeare Theater and San Diego's Old Globe Theatre presented Red Velvet in 2017–18. Red Velvet has had more than 25 productions in the United States.

The play won Chakrabarti the Charles Wintour Award for Most Promising Playwright at the 2012 Evening Standard Theatre Awards. That same year she was nominated for Best New Play and London Newcomer of the Year at the WhatsOnStage Awards. She won the award for Most Promising Playwright at the Critics' Circle Awards in January 2013 and received the AWA Award for Arts and Culture that same year. Red Velvet was also nominated for an Olivier Award in 2013.

Life of Pi 
Chakrabarti's adaptation of Life of Pi, based on Yann Martel's 2001 novel, premiered at the Crucible Theatre, Sheffield in June 2019. Following critical acclaim, the production transferred to the Wyndham's Theatre, West End in November 2021. Chakrabarti was awarded the Olivier Award for Best New Play for her work, and numerous other accolades including a WhatsOnStage Award, UK Theatre Award and CAMEO Award.

Producing
Chakrabarti ran Lesata Productions with Rosa Maggiora. In 2011, they produced Of Mary, a short film that won the Best Short Film Award at PAFF, Los Angeles, 2012. Chakrabarti and Maggiora were nominated for the Best Producer Award at the Underwire Film Festival, London, 2011.

Personal life
Chakrabarti is married to actor Adrian Lester, whom she met while they were both students at RADA. They have two daughters.

She was awarded Officer of the Order of the British Empire (OBE) in the 2021 Birthday Honours for services to drama.

References

External links

1969 births
Actresses from Kingston upon Hull
Actresses from Yorkshire
Alumni of RADA
British actresses of Indian descent
British writers of Indian descent
English dramatists and playwrights
English people of Bengali descent
English people of Indian descent
English stage actresses
English television actresses
English women dramatists and playwrights
Living people
Officers of the Order of the British Empire
20th-century English actresses
21st-century English actresses
21st-century English dramatists and playwrights
21st-century English women writers
Writers from Kingston upon Hull
Writers from Yorkshire